The United States Revenue Act of 1948 reduced individual income tax rates 5-13 percent, increased the personal exemption amount from $500 to $600, permitted married couples to split their incomes for tax purposes, made the distinction between community property jurisdictions and non-community property jurisdictions less relevant in the administration of the income, estate, and gift taxes, and provided additional exemption for taxpayers age 65 and older.  The Revenue Act of 1948 was vetoed by President Harry S. Truman, but his veto was overridden on April 2, 1948, by a two-thirds vote of each House of the Republican-controlled Eightieth Congress of the United States.

United States federal taxation legislation
1948 in law
1948 in the United States